The Charleston Area Regional Transportation Authority (CARTA) provides area residents and visitors public transportation within parts of Charleston and Dorchester counties in the Lowcountry region of South Carolina, including the cities of Charleston, North Charleston and the surrounding communities of Mount Pleasant, Summerville, James Island, Sullivan's Island, and the Isle of Palms. CARTA presently contracts with Transdev for staffing and managing the bus drivers in addition to maintaining and scheduling the buses.

CARTA began service in 1997 and operates seven days a week on each day of the year. In addition to its regular fixed routes, CARTA offers express commuter service on weekdays, a free area shuttle service in downtown Charleston, and Tel-A-Ride services for eligible residents.

History 
As with many communities across the United States, the Charleston region was served by streetcars and buses that were operated by electric companies. The bus system in Charleston was operated by SCE&G until 1997. In 1978, the popular Downtown Area Shuttle or DASH service began with the help of a federal grant. DASH service continues to this day. During the 1980s, mass transit options in Charleston were reduced. An effort to create a regional transportation authority that would operate public transportation were defeated by voters in a referendum.

In 1997, after learning that SCE&G intended to cease operating buses, the City of Charleston, the City of North Charleston, the Town of Mt. Pleasant and Charleston County joined together to create the Charleston Area Regional Transportation Authority (CARTA).

From its inception, CARTA has been hampered by insufficient funding it claimed it required to operate effectively. The transportation service provider explored many avenues to increase funding over the years but no source provided enough to keep CARTA from making substantial reductions in service. CARTA was forced to cease most of its operations in January 2004 and relied on emergency funding from state and federal funding streams to keep it from being liquidated. In early November 2004, a half-cent sales tax referendum was passed (following one instance where it failed and another overturned), providing CARTA with the revenue to relaunch many of the services that were eliminated or consolidated due to insufficient funding. CARTA even added new routes and services throughout their rebuilding phases, as was the case with the launch of #CARTA Express in January 2007. On September 1, 2010, CARTA suffered a budget problem which stranded 22,443 passengers during the day and 40,500 passengers during the night.

Despite budgetary setbacks, CARTA ridership continues to increase and become more popular. In 2013, CARTA reported its busiest year of operations, with nearly five million riders for 2012 and a weekday average of over 15,000 riders. DASH service accounted for nearly 1.2 million rides in 2012. In late 2013, CARTA inaugurated its North Area Shuttle service (NASH) as a free circulator route to serve the North Charleston area, however this service was suspended in June 2014 due to low ridership. In February 2014, the NASH Express service was launched, creating an express route between Charleston International Airport and downtown Charleston.

Services

CARTA Express 
CARTA Express is a commuter-style service with limited stops from select locations in the region with service to or through downtown Charleston. CARTA Express buses are full-sized commuter-style buses with reclining, upholstered “airline-style” seats, reading lights and overhead luggage racks. Single door entry provides more room and beverages are allowed on board. The fare for any Express route is $3.50 per one-way ride; passengers can also purchase an Express Monthly Gold Pass for $88 which is good for any and all Express routes as well as all Fixed Route services.

As of February 2014, there are four active CARTA Express routes:

Fixed Route services 
CARTA offers fixed route services to much of the Charleston area by offering trips on select routes which run seven days a week, with limited services on Sundays and select holidays. Routes are serviced by large passenger buses complete with bench seating, two entrances, a wheelchair lift and a bike rack with space for two bikes on the front of each bus. Routes that are less heavily traveled may are sometimes serviced with minibuses.

Services to the north of downtown Charleston
Route 10 – Rivers Avenue
Route 11 – Dorchester/Airport
Route 12 – Upper Dorchester/AFB
Route 13 – Remount Road

Services within downtown Charleston
Route 7 – Hospitality on Peninsula (HOP) Shuttle (Temporarily suspended until further notice)
Route 20 – King Street/Citadel
Route 203 – Medical Shuttle (loop route)
Route 204 – MUSC/Calhoun Circulator (Suspended February 2021)

Services to the west, south, and east of downtown Charleston
Route 30 – Savannah Highway
Route 31 – Folly Road
Route 32 – North Bridge
Route 33 – Ashley River Rd.
Route 40 – Mt. Pleasant
Route 41 – Coleman Boulevard
Route 42 – Wando Circulator
Route 301 – Glenn McConnell Connector

Services in other areas of the region
Route 102 – North Neck
Route 103 – Leeds Avenue
Route 104 – Montague Avenue

Regular adult bus fares are $2.00 per trip and transfers are FREE. Special fares are available for senior citizens, staff, faculty and students. Children aged six and younger ride for free when they are accompanied by a paying passenger. Students in grades K-12 ride free (school I.D. Cards are encouraged).

Seniors aged 55 years and older pay $1.00 for Fixed Route and Express services Drivers may request proof of age (Medicare cards or an I.D. card with date of birth will be accepted).

Disabled patrons or passengers with a valid Tel-A-Ride I.D. card can ride Fixed Route services for free every day, all day.

DASH service 
The Downtown Area Shuttle (or DASH) service connects visitors to many key destinations throughout the downtown Charleston area. CARTA’s DASH service operates on three main routes to get passengers around downtown.

Route 210 – Aquarium/College of Charleston
Route 211 – Meeting/King
Route 213 – Lockwood/Calhoun

As of 2022, a ride on the DASH service is free.

CARTA Tel-A-Ride 
If passengers are unable to get to a bus, Tel-A-Ride comes to them within a defined Tel-A-Ride Service area. Curbside service is available for those who meet the requirements for the Americans with Disabilities Act. Smaller “neighborhood” buses are used for the CARTA Tel-A-Ride service offering both single-door entry and wheelchair accessibility.

Tel-A-Ride fares are $4.00 per trip.

Defunct services 
CARTA@Night was implemented to take passengers to any stop within four designated “zones” after most regular bus service has ended. This service was discontinued in December 2010 due to budget problems.
CARTA@Night routes were serviced by the large passenger buses (found during the day on the #Fixed Route Services) and the smaller “neighborhood” buses (used daily for #CARTA Tel-A-Ride service operation). CARTA at Night was $2.00 and free with CARTA Express Monthly Gold Pass; all other pass holders were required to pay a $0.75 up charge.

Route 105, also known as the North Area Shuttle (or NASH) service connected visitors with attractions in North Charleston, including the "old town", the Tanger Outlet Center, the North Charleston Visitors Center, and the North Convention Center Complex, which includes the North Charleston Coliseum and the North Charleston Performing Arts Center. The service was cancelled in June 2014 due to low ridership.

North Charleston Intermodal Transportation Center 
After more than 15 years of planning, ground broke on the North Charleston Intermodal Transportation Center on September 5, 2007. The site will eventually serve as a transportation hub for amtrak passenger trains, commuter rail, Greyhound buses, CARTA buses, area taxis and shuttles used by the Charleston International Airport.
The facility will be located at the intersection of Montague Avenue and Seiberling Road in North Charleston and in close proximity to the airport, the coliseum and convention center and Tanger Outlet. Funding shortages have caused delays in the project, however work is set to resume in 2014.

References

External links 

Bus transportation in South Carolina
Public transportation in South Carolina
Transportation in Charleston, South Carolina
Transportation in North Charleston, South Carolina
Intermodal transportation authorities in South Carolina